This is a timeline of the North African campaign.

1940 
•May 1940 — Army of Africa (France) — 14 regiments of zouaves, 42 regiments of Algerian, Tunisian and Moroccan tirailleurs, 12 regiments and demi-brigades of the Foreign Legion and 13 battalions of African Light Infantry were serving on all fronts.  
 10 June: The Kingdom of Italy declares war upon France and the United Kingdom
 14 June: British forces cross from Egypt into Libya and capture Fort Capuzzo
 16 June: The first tank battle of the North African campaign takes place, the "Engagement at Nezuet Ghirba"
 July 1940: British navy shells French warships in the port of Oran to keep them out of German hands
 13 September: Italian forces invade Egypt from Libya
 16 September: Italian forces establish front east of Sidi Barrani
 9 December: British and Indian forces launch Operation Compass with the Battle of Marmarica (Battle of the camps)
 9 December: Indian forces capture Nibeiwa with cover from British artillery
 9 December: British tanks and Indian troops overrun Tummar West followed by Tummar East
 10 December: Indian forces capture Sidi Barrani with support from British artillery
 11 December: British armoured forces arrived in Sofafi but Libyan and Italian divisions escaped
 16 December: Sollum retaken by Allies

1941 
 5 January: Bardia captured by British and Australian force
 22 January: Tobruk captured by British and Australian force
 30 January: Australians capture Derna, Libya
 5 February: Beda Fomm captured by British
 6 February;
 Fall of Benghazi to the Western Desert Force.
 Lieutenant-General Erwin Rommel is appointed commander of Afrika Korps.
 7 February: What remains of the Italian Tenth Army surrenders.
 9 February: Churchill orders halt to British and Australian advance at El Agheila to allow withdrawal of troops to defend Greece
 14 February: First units of the Afrika Korps under Erwin Rommel start to arrive in Libya during Operation Sonnenblume
 24 March: Allied forces at El Agheila defeated; Erwin Rommel starts his advance.
 4 April: Australian & British forces withdraw from Benghazi; Benghazi and Msus captured by Axis.
 6 April: British 3rd Armored Brigade is captured in Derna
 8 April: British, Indian and Australian forces captured at Mechili
 10 April: Siege of Tobruk begins with Australian, British and Indian forces defending
 15 April: British forces are pushed back to Sollum on Egyptian border with Libya
 30 April: Australian forces lose a small part of their positions in Tobruk during the Battle of Salient, roughly a 6th of Tobruk is now held by Germans
 3 May: Australian counterattack at Tobruk fails
 15 May: British troops launch Operation Brevity to gain more territory from which to launch Operation Battleaxe later in the year
 16 May: Italian forces attack Australian forces in Tobruk forcing them to withdraw [who withdrew?]
 16 May: Operation Brevity called off. Allied forces fall back onto the Halfaya Pass, captured the previous day
 26 May: German forces launch Operation Skorpion and move up to Halfaya Pass
 27 May: German forces recapture Halfaya Pass; British troops are forced to withdraw
 15 June: British and Indian troops launch Operation Battleaxe which fails
 5 July: Auchinleck replaces Wavell as C-in-C Middle East Command
 15 August: German Panzer Group Afrika activated with Rommel in Command
 18 September: German air raid on Cairo in which 39 Egyptian civilians are killed and nearly 100 injured, bringing condemnation against the Axis from the Arab and Muslim press. Radio Berlin later apologizes to its Arab listeners.
 1 October: 5th Light Division renamed 21st Panzer Division
 18 November: Auchinleck's Operation Crusader begins (Operation Crusader (18 November – 30 December 1941) with British, Indian, South African and New Zealander forces
 21 November: British armoured division defeated at Sidi Rezegh and withdraws
 22 November;
 New Zealand forces attack Bir Ghirba but fail
 Indian forces capture Sidi Omar
 23 November: New Zealand forces capitalize on Indian advances to wreck Afrika Korps HQ at Bir el Chleta
 23 November:
 Rommel launches Panzer attacks on the British XXX Corps but faces resistance from SA, NZ and British forces
 British and NZ forces withdraw towards Bir el Gubi
 25 November:
 Panzer attack on Indian forces at Sidi Omar is repulsed
 In the second attack in the evening, Indian forces destroy the 5th Panzer Regiment of the 21st Panzer Division
 26 November: Ritchie replaces Cunningham as commander Eighth Army
 27 November: New Zealand troops at Sidi Azeiz defeated by overwhelming advance of Panzers and German infantry
 28 November: 15th Panzer despite being outnumbered 2:1 forces British tanks to retreat, exposing the New Zealand forces at Ed Duda on the Tobruk by-pass
 1 December: New Zealand troops in Sidi Rezegh suffer heavy casualties from Panzers
 3 December:
 German infantry suffers big defeat at the hand of New Zealand forces on the Bardia road near Menastir
 German forces suffer losses against Indian forces and withdraw at Capuzzo (Trigh Capuzzo)
 4 December:
 NZ forces repulse German attack on Ed Duda
 Indian forces face attrition in an uphill attempt to capture Point 174 against entrenched Italian forces without artillery support
 9 December: Tobruk siege relieved by Eighth Army consisting of British, Indian, New Zealand and South African forces; White Knoll captured by the Polish Carpathian Brigade from the elements of the Italian Brescia Division
 13 December;
 8th Army attacks Gazala line
 NZ forces stopped at Alem Hamza
 Indian forces take Point 204
 Indian infantry face Afrika Korps and against heavy odds destroy 15 of 39 Panzers
 14 December: Indian troops repel repeated Panzer attacks on Point 204
 15 December: German advance overruns British forces en route to Point 204 but Indian forces at Point 204 hold on
 16 December: Rommel facing reduced Panzer numbers orders withdrawal from the Gazala line
 24 December: British forces capture Benghazi
 25 December: Agedabia reached by the Allies
 27 December: Rommel inflicts many losses on British tanks who have to withdraw allowing Rommel to fall back to El Agheila
 31 December: Front lines return to El Agheila

1942 
 21 January;
 Rommel's second offensive begins
 A lone He 111 of the Sonderkommando Blaich successfully bombs the Fort Lamy air field
 begins Operation Theseus
 23 January: Agedabia captured by Axis forces
 29 January: Benghazi captured by Axis forces
 4 February: Front line established between Gazala and Bir Hakeim
 26 May: Axis forces assault the Gazala line, the Battle of Gazala (26 May to 21 June 1942) and Battle of Bir Hakeim begins
 11 June: Axis forces begin offensive from "the Cauldron" position
 13 June: "Black Saturday". Axis inflicts heavy defeat on British armoured divisions
 21 June: Axis capture of Tobruk
 28 June: Mersa Matruh, Egypt, falls to Rommel.
 29 June: U.S. reports from Egypt of British military operations stop using the compromised "Black Code" which the Axis were reading.
 30 June: Axis forces reach El Alamein and attack the Allied defences, the First Battle of El Alamein begins
 4 July: First Battle of El Alamein continues as Axis digs in and Eighth Army launches series of attacks
 31 July: Auchinleck calls off offensive activities to allow Eighth Army to regroup and resupply
 13 August: Alexander and Montgomery take command respectively of Middle East Command and Eighth Army
 30 August: Rommel launches unsuccessful Battle of Alam el Halfa
 13 September: Allies launch unsuccessful Operation Agreement, a large scale amphibious raid directed against Tobruk
 23 October: Montgomery launches Operation Lightfoot starting the Second Battle of El Alamein (23 October – 11 November 1942)
 5 November: Axis lines broken at El Alamein 
 8 November: Operation Torch is launched under the command of General Eisenhower, Allied forces land in Morocco and Algeria.
 9 November: Sidi Barrani captured by Eighth Army
 10–27 November: Case Anton
 13 November: Tobruk captured by Eighth Army
 15 November: British forces capture Derna in Libya.
 17 November: First Army (Operation Torch's Eastern Task Force) and Axis meet at Djebel Abiod in Tunisia
 20 November: Benghazi captured by Eighth Army
 27 November: First Army advance halted between Terbourba and Djedeida, 12 miles from Tunis, by Axis counterattack
 10 December: First Army front line pushed back to defensive positions east of Medjez el Bab
 12 December: Eighth Army starts an offensive towards Axis forces near El Agheila
 22 December: First Army starts three-day offensive towards Tebourba which fails
 25 December: Sirte captured by Eighth Army

1943 
• Creation of the French Expeditionary Corps (1943–44)
•The French Liberation Army (French: , AFL) a reunified French Army, is created in 1943 when the Army of Africa led by General Giraud is combined with the Free French Forces of General de Gaulle.
•Italian campaign (World War II) begins (1943 to 1945)

 23 January: Tripoli captured by British Eighth Army
 30 January: Axis forces capture Faïd pass in central Tunisia
 4 February: Axis forces in Libya retreat to Tunisian border south of the Mareth Line
 14 February: Axis advance from Faïd to launch Battle of Sidi Bou Zid and enter Sbeitla two days later
 19 February: Battle of Kasserine Pass launched by Axis forces
 6 March: Axis launch Operation Capri against Eighth Army at Medenine but lose 55 tanks. Patton takes command of II Corps.
 16 March: Battle of the Mareth Line begins
 19 March: Eighth Army launches Operation Pugilist
 23 March: U.S. II Corps emerge from Kasserine to match the Axis at Battle of El Guettar.  Battle of Mareth ends.
 26 March: Eighth Army launch Operation Supercharge II outflanking and making the Axis position at Mareth untenable.  Battle of Tebaga Gap takes place.
 4 April: The 9-man crew of the US Air Force B-24 Liberator Lady Be Good fails to return from a bombing raid; the crew parachute from the aircraft but become lost and perish in the Libyan desert
 6 April: Right wing of First Army links with Eighth Army. Battle of Wadi Akarit takes place.
 22 April: Allied forces launch Operation Vulcan
 6 May: Allied forces launch Operation Strike
 7 May: British enter Tunis, Americans enter Bizerte
 13 May: Axis Powers surrender in Tunisia.
14 May: Moncef Bey deposed in Tunisia
 15 May: Muhammad VIII al-Amin installed as Bey of Tunisia
 1 August: Operation Tidal Wave attacks Nazi oil refineries in Romania, from remote base at Benghazi, Libya
 10 December: the Moroccan Istiqlal Party holds first congress under Gaulist/US auspices

1944
•Food shortages and growth of Tunisian and Algerian nationalist movements

15 August - Operation Dragoon, Allied landing in Provence: Capture ports of Toulon and Marseille; AFL make up the majority of troops landing on French soil

1945
8 May: Sétif massacre of Algerian demonstrators for independence on the day of German surrender

See also 
 Western Desert Campaign
 Operation Torch
 Tunisia Campaign

Footnotes

References 
 
 
 
 
 

+
United States military history timelines